RoboRally is a board game for 2–8 players designed by Richard Garfield and published by Wizards of the Coast (WotC) in 1994. Various expansions and revisions have been published by both WotC and by Avalon Hill.

Description

In RoboRally, 2–8 players assume control of "Robot Control Computers" in a dangerous widget factory filled with moving, course-altering conveyor belts, metal-melting laser beams, bottomless pits, crushers, and a variety of other obstacles. Using randomly dealt "program cards", the controllers attempt to maneuver their robot to reach a pre-designated number of checkpoints in a particular order.

Components
The game box contains:
4 double-sided map boards
8 player mats
8 robot tokens and matching archive markers
8 Power Down tokens
 84 Program cards that either move a robot ahead or back, or turn it either 90 degrees left or right, or reverse its direction
26 Option cards
40 Life markers
60 Damage tokens
two-sided Docking Bay board
30-second hourglass timer
rulebook

Set-up
Each player chooses a robot token and its matching archive token, and also receives three life tokens and a player mat. The players choose a race course by common consent, place numbered flags on it according to the race course chosen, and abut the Docking Panel board against the side of the map indicated by the race course chosen. In randomly determined order, each player places their robot on a starting square on the Docking Bay board with their matching archive marker under the robot.

Preparing to move
On each turn: 
 The Program card deck is shuffled and nine cards are dealt to each player. 
 For each point of robot damage, the number of cards is reduced by 1.
Players plan how to get to the first numbered flag, choose five Program cards from their hand as the robot's next five moves, and place the cards in order facedown on the table. 
When all players but one have chosen their cards, the 30-second sand timer is started. If this runs out while the last player is still choosing cards, the player's cards are chosen at random from the player's hand.
Unused cards are placed in a discard pile.

Movement
 Each player simultaneously reveals their first Program card. The player with the highest numbered Program card moves first, followed by each player in order of descending Program card values.
If the robot hits a wall, it cannot proceed.
If a robot hits another robot, it pushes the second robot in front of it.

End of phase
After everyone has moved (called a "phase")
the express conveyor belts move any robots on it one space in the direction of its arrows, rotating as the space they move on to. 
the slow and express conveyor belts move any robots one space in the direction of its arrows, rotating as the space they move on to. 
pushers push if active for that register phase.
gears rotate robots either 90 degrees clockwise or counterclockwise as indicated by their directional arrows
every board laser and robot fires a high intensity laser down the row of squares in front of them. If the beam hits a robot before being stopped by a wall, the target robot takes a point of damage.
crushers activate, destroying any robot on them.
If a robot ends a phase on a wrench or numbered flag, the player moves the robot's archive marker to that flag. If the robot was seeking that flag, the player now attempts to reach the next numbered flag.
If a robot ends a turn on any repair site (a space with a wrench), the robot's archive marker is moved to that spot. 
If a robot ends a turn on a space with one wrench, one point of damage is repaired.
If a robot ends a turn on a space with two wrenches, two points of damage are repaired OR the robot receives a random upgrade card.
If a robot ends a turn on a space with a wrench and a hammer, one point of damage is repaired, AND the robot receives a random upgrade card.
Play then returns to the beginning of the next turn.

A player can choose to totally repair their robot by announcing, a turn in advance while programming their robot, that their robot will "power down" at the end of the coming turn. The robot plays the programmed turn, then shuts down for the entire next turn to repir itself. The robot returns to 100A% status at the end of the turn. Any damage taken during the repair turn reduces the robot's current point total before repairs, and may destroy the robot before it completes its repairs.

Robot destruction
If a robot takes more than 9 points of damage, or falls down a pit or drives off the board or is pushed off the board, the robot is destroyed. The player loses a Life token, and a clone of the robot with two damage returns at the start of the next turn on the robot's archive marker. If a player runs out of Life tokens, (four robots destroyed), the player is out of the game.

Victory conditions
The first robot to touch the final numbered flag is the winner.

Publication history
Game designer Richard Garfield designed RoboRally in 1985, but when he first showed it to WotC, they were uninterested. After WotC produced Garfield's collectible card game Magic: The Gathering in 1993, they expressed interest in publishing RoboRally, which was released in 1995 with pewter playing tokens designed by Phil Foglio, who also did the artwork for the game.

Several updates and expansions rapidly followed, including a second edition (1996); Armed and Dangerous (1996); Crash and Burn (1997); Grand Prix (1997); and Radioactive (1999).

In 2005, Avalon Hill re-published the game with minor rule revisions and cosmetic changes that included replacing the pewter robots tokens with plastic robots. Eleven years later, Avalon Hill re-released the game in 2016 with revised boards and substantial rules changes making the game incompatible with the previous editions.

Reception
In Issue 18 of Shadis, David Williams liked this "manic racing game", and thought that the components were of "high quality" but questioned the use of expensive pewter playing pieces instead of plastic tokens, saying, "Wizards did not cut corners, but it would be nice to have a cheaper option."

In Issue 2 of Arcane, Andy Butcher found that this was a good game for casual playing. He concluded by giving it an average rating of 7 out of 10, saying, "anyone who's looking for great way to while away a couple of hours and have fun is strongly advised to check this out – it's simple to learn, extremely replayable, and most importantly, a great game – although you do need at least four players to get the most out of it."

John ONeill of Black Gate commented that "all the challenge comes in the nature of your idiotic robots, and the numerous ways they can stumble stoically – nay, joyously – towards their own destruction on the factory floor."

RoboRally was chosen for inclusion in the 2007 book Hobby Games: The 100 Best. James Ernest commented: "Why is RoboRally one of the best hobby games ever? Besides being a completely solid game at heart, RoboRally succeeds at one of the hardest tricks in game design: it is genuinely funny. I don't just mean that it has funny jokes in the rules or funny robot characters. It has those things, but putting jokes in a rulebook is relatively easy. The richest humor in this game comes from the play of the game itself."

Other reviews and commentary
Rollespilsmagasinet Fønix (Danish) (Issue 10 - October/November 1995)
Pyramid

Awards
 At the 1995 Origins Awards, RoboRally won awards in two categories: 
"Best Fantasy or Science Fiction Boardgame of 1994"
"Best Graphic Presentation of a Boardgame of 1994"
At the 1996 Origins Awards, the Armed and Dangerous expansion won "Best Graphic Presentation of a Boardgame of 1995"
At the 1997 Origins Awards, RoboRally Grand Prix won "Best Fantasy or Science Fiction Boardgame of 1996"

Editions and expansions (with board names)
Between 1994 and 1999 Wizards of the Coast (WotC) released the original game, four expansion sets, and a limited edition board.
 RoboRally (first edition, WotC, 1994): Basic boards (6), unpainted metal miniatures with detached plastic bases (8), movement cards, option cards, and counters.
 RoboRally (second edition, WotC, 1995): Basic boards (same 6, with lighter coloring), unpainted metal miniatures with integrated metal bases (8), movement cards, option cards, and counters.
 Armed and Dangerous (WotC, 1995): Additional boards (6), additional option cards, and counters.
 Crash and Burn (WotC, 1997): Additional boards (2)
 Grand Prix (WotC, 1997): Additional boards (3), with randomly selected reprinted basic boards on the backs.
 Radioactive (WotC, 1998): Additional boards (3)
 "Origins ’99" (WotC, 1999): A single new board (King of the Hill), only given to finalists in the championship tournament.

In Europe (German by Amigo, and Dutch by 999 Games), a different series was released. It incorporated a few rules changes and fewer components to make the game simpler. The damage and life tokens are larger and thicker than those of the original American release. The movement cards are color-coded. Forward (Move) cards have blue arrows, Backward (Back Up) cards have red ones and Turn cards yellow ones.

 RoboRally (Amigo, 1999; and 999 Games, 2000): Basic boards (4, lettered instead of named), prepainted plastic bots (4), color-coded movement cards, counters.
 Crash & Burn (Amigo, 2000): Additional boards (4, lettered instead of named), prepainted plastic bots (4), option cards.

The Avalon Hill edition also changed the cards. The new Move cards have only an arrow in the corner instead of the number with the arrow, which means you have to look at the full face of the card to distinguish them. It also has larger counters. Character sheets were introduced to track damage, life counters, power-down status, and program cards. Each sheet also contains a copy of the turn sequence for reference. The graphics have been redesigned to make the functionality of board elements clearer. The rules were also simplified to remove the concept of virtual robots.

 RoboRally (Avalon Hill, 2005): Double-sided boards (4), Docking Bay (a double-sided starting grid, one-third the size of a regular board), plastic bots (8), movement cards, option cards, plastic flags (8), sand timer, and counters. The board combinations are Chop Shop & Island, Spin Zone & Maelstrom, Chess & Cross, and Vault & Exchange.

The 2016 edition significantly changed the damage system and gave every player an individual deck rather than a shared deck. Priority is determined by proximity to an antenna token and archive markers have been replaced with respawn point tokens. The boards in this edition are 10x10 rather than 12x12, and are named 1A, 1B - 6A and 6B. The docking bay is 10x3.

 Robo Rally (Avalon Hill, 2016): Double-sided boards (6), double-sided start board, prepainted plastic bots (6), individual movement decks, damage decks, option cards, plastic flags (6), sand timer, plastic antenna token, plastic energy cubes and counters

Online
A large number of additional game boards and elements are available via Internet communities, created by fans of the game.

In August 2008, GameTableOnline.com (defunct and redirected to a porn site, as of October 2020) licensed the rights for an online version of RoboRally from Wizards of the Coast.

References

External links
Wizards of the Coast's 

 roboracer

Amigo Spiele games
Avalon Hill games
Board games introduced in 1994
Board games with a modular board
Origins Award winners
Richard Garfield games
Science fiction board games
Wizards of the Coast games